The World Rally-Raid Championship (officially abbreviated as W2RC) is a rally raid series organised by the Amaury Sport Organization and co-sanctioned by the FIA and FIM. The championship's seasons culminate with world championship titles in both automobile and motorcycle categories.

Beginning in 2022, the series replaced both the FIA World Cup for Cross-Country Rallies and FIM Cross-Country Rallies World Championship as the top echelon of the sport of rally raid. The ASO will serve as series promotor for a period of five years.

History
The combined World Championship series was conceived as a result of efforts by the ASO, FIA and FIM to harmonize regulations. After a vote by the World Motorsport Council to officially make rally raid the seventh world championship under the FIA in 2021, they joined with the FIM to combine their respective international cross-country rallying series into a single World Rally-Raid Championship. The ASO, promotor of the Dakar Rally, was chosen by both world-governing bodies as the sole promotor of the series for a period of five years.

The inaugural World Championship officially kicked off with the 2022 Dakar Rally and ended in Morocco following revisions to the schedule due to the Russian Invasion of Ukraine, forcing the cancellation of that year's Rally Kazakhstan, and environmental concerns that forced the Andalucia Rally to be rescheduled. The inaugural winners of the FIA World Rally-Raid Championship were Nasser Al-Attiyah and Mathieu Baumel with Toyota Gazoo Racing as the winning manufacturer; while Sam Sunderland did likewise in the FIM World Rally-Raid Championship with Monster Energy Honda.

Format
The championship consists primarily of two forms of cross-country rallying:
Cross-Country Rally: Between four and six timed stages; total distance of 1200km.
Cross-Country Marathon: More than six timed stages; total distance of 2500km.

The cross-country baja format continues to be contested in the international FIA World Cup for Cross-Country Bajas and FIM Bajas World Cup competitions, separate from the world championship.

Categories and awards
The series covers various categories under both the FIA and FIM.

FIA categories
T1: Prototype Cross-Country Cars
T2: Series Production Cross-Country Cars
T3: Lightweight Prototype Cross-Country Vehicles
FIA Rally-Raid Championship for T3 drivers and co-drivers.
T4: Modified Production Cross-Country Side-by-Side Vehicles
FIA Rally-Raid Championship for T4 drivers and co-drivers.
T5: Prototype and Production Cross-Country Trucks
FIA Rally-Raid Championship for T5 drivers and co-drivers.

Groups T1, T2, T3 and T4 are eligible for the overall FIA Rally-Raid World Championship titles for drivers, co-drivers, and manufacturers. Additional Group-specific championships are awarded in Groups T3, T4 and T5.

FIM categories
RallyGP
FIM Rally-Raid World Championship for riders and manufacturers
Rally2
FIM Rally-Raid World Cup for Rally2 Riders
FIM Rally-Raid Trophy for Juniors
FIM Rally-Raid Trophy for Women
FIM Rally-Raid Trophy for Seniors
Rally3
FIM Rally-Raid World Cup for Rally3 Riders
FIM Rally-Raid Trophy for Juniors
Quad
FIM Rally-Raid World Cup for Quad Riders

Only riders competing in the RallyGP category are eligible for the FIM Rally-Raid World Championship. World Cup titles are available for champions of the Rally2, Rally3, and Quad categories.

Champions

FIA Rally-Raid World Champions

FIM Rally-Raid World Champions

FIA Rally-Raid Champions

FIM Rally-Raid World Cup

FIM Rally-Raid Trophies

See also
FIA World Cup for Cross-Country Bajas
FIM Bajas World Cup

References

External links
 
  - FIA Rally-Raid
  - FIM Rally-Raid

Rally raid